Newton North  may refer to:
Newton North, Pembrokeshire, Wales, UK
Newton North High School, Mass., USA